Crow Island is an inhabited island located in New Bedford Harbor in Fairhaven, Massachusetts.

References

Fairhaven, Massachusetts
Coastal islands of Massachusetts
Islands of Bristol County, Massachusetts